Onorio Marinari (1627 – January 5, 1715) was an Italian painter and printmaker of the Baroque period, active mainly in Florence. His father, Sigismondo di Pietro Marinari, was also a painter, and he trained with his cousin, Carlo Dolci, later being also influenced by Simone Pignoni and Francesco Furini.

His fresco in the Palazzo Capponi, Florence, is dated 1707. He worked mainly in Florence for Florentine and Tuscan clients, but he did not devote himself only to painting. In fact, in 1674, he published an essay on astronomy entitled Fabbrica ed uso dell' Annulo Astronomico. Bartolomeo Bimbi was one of his pupils.

Sources
Getty Museum entry
Web Gallery of Art

Works

 

1627 births
1715 deaths
Painters from Florence
Italian printmakers
17th-century Italian painters
Italian male painters
18th-century Italian painters
Italian Baroque painters
18th-century Italian male artists